Drums Along the Mohawk is a 1939 American historical drama western film based upon a 1936 novel of the same name by American author Walter D. Edmonds. The film was produced by Darryl F. Zanuck and directed by John Ford. Henry Fonda and Claudette Colbert portray settlers on the New York frontier during the American Revolution. The couple experiences British, Tory, and Native American attacks on their farm before the Revolution ends and peace is restored.

Edmonds based the novel on a number of historic figures who lived in the valley. The film—Ford's first Technicolor feature—was well received. It was nominated for one Academy Award and became a major box-office success, grossing over US$1 million in its first year.

Plot
In colonial America, Lana Borst, the eldest daughter of a wealthy family, marries Gilbert Martin. Together, they leave her family's luxurious home to embark on a frontier life on Gil's small farm in Deerfield in the Mohawk Valley of central New York. The time is July 1776, and the spirit of revolution is in the air. The valley's mostly ethnic German settlers have formed a local militia in anticipation of an imminent war, and Gil joins up.

As Gil and his neighbors are clearing his land for farming, Blue Back, a friendly Oneida man, arrives to warn them that a raiding party of Seneca, led by a Tory named Caldwell, is in the valley. The settlers leave their farms and take refuge in nearby Fort Schuyler. Lana, who is pregnant, miscarries during the frantic ride to the fort. The Martin farm is destroyed by the Seneca raiding party. With no home and winter approaching, the Martins accept work on the farm of a wealthy widow, Mrs. McKlennar.

During a peaceful interlude, Mrs. McKlennar and the Martins prosper. Then, word comes that a large force of British soldiers and Native Americans are approaching the valley. The militia sets out westward to intercept the attackers, but their approach is badly timed and the party is ambushed. Though the enemy is eventually defeated at Oriskany, more than half of the militiamen are killed. Gil returns home, wounded and delirious, but slowly recovers. Lana is again pregnant and delivers a son.

Later, the British and their Native American allies mount a major attack to take the valley, and the settlers again take refuge in the fort. Mrs. McKlennar is mortally wounded and ammunition runs short. Gil makes a heroic dash through enemy lines to secure help from nearby Fort Dayton. Reinforcements arrive just in time to beat back the attackers, who are about to overwhelm the fort. The militia pursues, harasses, and defeats the British force, scattering its surviving soldiers in the wilderness. The Mohawk Valley is saved. Shortly afterward, a regiment arrives at the fort to announce that the war has ended; Cornwallis has surrendered to Washington at Yorktown. The settlers look forward to their future in the new, independent United States of America.

Cast

 Claudette Colbert as Magdalena "Lana" Borst Martin
 Henry Fonda as Gilbert "Gil" Martin
 Edna May Oliver as Sarah McKlennar
 Eddie Collins as Christian Reall
 John Carradine as Caldwell
 Ward Bond as Adam Helmer
 Roger Imhof as Gen. Nicholas Herkimer
 Arthur Shields as Rev. Rosenkrantz
 Chief John Big Tree as Blue Back
 Francis Ford as Joe Boleo
 Jessie Ralph as Mrs. Weaver
 Robert Lowery as John Weaver
 Kay Linaker as Mrs. Demooth
 Russell Simpson as Dr. Petry
 Spencer Charters as Innkeeper
 Tom Tyler as Capt. Morgan (uncredited)

Production
Parts of the film were shot in Utah, specifically in Duck Creek, Strawberry Valley, Mirror Lake, Navajo Lake, Sidney Valley, and Cedar Breaks National Monument.

Historical accuracy
Like most of John Ford's films, Drums Along the Mohawk is loosely based on historical events. A central feature of the plot is the Battle of Oriskany, a pivotal engagement of the Saratoga campaign during the American Revolutionary War, in which a British contingent drove southward from Canada in an attempt to occupy the Hudson Valley and isolate Connecticut, Rhode Island, New Hampshire, and Massachusetts from the remaining colonies. A second, smaller force called the St. Leger Expedition, traveled down the St Lawrence, across Lake Ontario, and marched across the Mohawk Valley heading from the west, and besieged Fort Schuyler, now better known under its original, prewar name of Fort Stanwix.

At this time, the Mohawk Valley of upstate New York was simultaneously the traditional homeland of the Iroquois Six Nations, a powerful political and military force in the region prior to the American Revolution, while also home to an increasing number of primarily White settlers. (Black slaves were brought in the region and both the Whites and some Iroquois, too, sometimes owned slaves of African descent.) The Iroquois Confederacy, while dependent on the White civilization for trade goods and economic opportunities, was quite concerned about the increasing presence and growing numbers of White settlers in their homeland. While at first eager to try to stay neutral in the conflict between many settlers and the British crown, this proved impossible for several reasons, and the bulk of the Iroquois nations chose sides in the conflict. The Seneca and the Mohawk, led by Joseph Brant, sided with the British, motivated by their tradition good relations with the British and Sir William Johnson and his family, and the British promise to continue to work to reduce White settlement in their homeland. Others, notably the Oneida, sided with the Americans and participated in this conflict on the rebel side throughout the war.

Prior to the arrival of the St. Leger Expedition, the conflict in the region was primarily between local people who wished to remain loyal to the crown and those who wished to separate from British rule.  Locally recruited units of Loyalists also participated in the fighting in the region. Troops from the King's Royal Regiment of New York, (also known as Johnson's Royal Greens) and Butler's Rangers, participated in the campaign and fought at the Battle of Oriskany on the side of the Crown with Mohawk and Seneca warriors.

Contrary to its depiction in the film, Fort Schuyler was situated far from any civilian settlements at the site of an important portage of east-west travel through the Mohawk Valley. The fort was besieged by British, Loyalists, and Brunswick German Jaeger riflemen (not Hessian) soldiers aided by Seneca and Mohawk warriors, and was defended by Continental Army soldiers from the 3rd New York Regiment and troops from Massachusetts, not militiamen. The Tryon County militia, under General Nicholas Herkimer, aided by Oneida Iroquois, attempted to assist in the fort's defense, but they were ambushed on their way there by a predominantly Mohawk, Seneca, and loyalist force at Oriskany, six miles east of the fort.

Some sources state that attacks on settlements in the Mohawk Valley lacked a historical basis, and were included in the film because Ford felt obliged to perpetuate the mythology. Others contend that countless raids were conducted throughout the war, often by hostile Native Americans allied with loyalists from New York, such as Butler's Rangers and the King's Royal Regiment of New York. Among these were the Cherry Valley Massacre, the Battle of Cobleskill, the raid on the Ballston Lake, and others. Such attacks were one motivation for the later Sullivan Expedition and the Battle of Newtown, as Contintental forces tried to end this threat. Many of the Loyalists who had been forced to flee to Canada from the valley due to the war believed that attacks on their former neighbors in New York might result in the Mohawk Valley remaining Crown territory as part of Canada. This aspect of the war has been covered by, among others, the writings of Gavin K. Watt, a Canadian historian of Loyalist descent.

The film portrays only Native Americans and Tories as antagonists; British soldiers are seldom referenced or seen. While local Native American tribes and Tory loyalists were a factor in the actual Mohawk Valley campaign, their role was a minor one compared to that of the British Army. Ford chose to minimize the British role because of the political situation in 1939: "He knew that war with Germany was coming, and he had little desire to show the British as villains when they were fighting for their lives against the Nazis."

Also correctly portrayed is that the "American" or rebel forces represented in the film were, in historical fact, ethnically and linguistically diverse. The settlers in the Mohawk Valley included many German-speaking Palatines, including Nicholas Herkimer, and many Dutch, including the commander of Fort Schuyler, Peter Gansevoort of the 3rd New York Regiment.

Reception and legacy
Frank S. Nugent reviewed the film for The New York Times of November 4, 1939 and praised the film for its faithfulness to the book and well-balanced acting.

The film was nominated for an Academy Award for Best Supporting Actress (Edna May Oliver).

Drums Along the Mohawk was restored by the Academy Film Archive, in conjunction with The Film Foundation, in 2007.

See also
 List of films about the American Revolution
 List of television series and miniseries about the American Revolution

References

Further reading
 For a detailed comparison of the film with Edmonds' novel, see:

External links

 
 
 
 

1939 films
1930s color films
1930s war drama films
1930s historical drama films
American war drama films
American Western (genre) films
1939 Western (genre) films
American Revolutionary War films
Films based on American novels
Films set in 1776
Films set in the 1780s
Films set in New York (state)
20th Century Fox films
Films directed by John Ford
Films produced by Darryl F. Zanuck
Films with screenplays by Sonya Levien
Films with screenplays by Lamar Trotti
Films scored by Alfred Newman
Films shot in Utah
1939 drama films
1930s English-language films
1930s American films